The Virginia Declaration of Rights was drafted in 1776 to proclaim the inherent rights of men, including the right to reform or abolish "inadequate" government.  It influenced a number of later documents, including the United States Declaration of Independence (1776) and the United States Bill of Rights (1789).

Drafting and adoption

The Declaration was adopted unanimously by the Fifth Virginia Convention at Williamsburg, Virginia on June 12, 1776, as a separate document from the Constitution of Virginia which was later adopted on  June 29, 1776. In 1830, the Declaration of Rights was incorporated within the Virginia State Constitution as Article I, but even before that Virginia's Declaration of Rights stated that it was '"the basis and foundation of government" in Virginia.  A slightly updated version may still be seen in Virginia's Constitution, making it legally in effect to this day.

Ten articles were initially drafted by George Mason , 1776; three other articles were added in committee, seen in the original draft in the handwriting of Thomas Ludwell Lee, but the author is unknown.
James Madison later proposed liberalizing the article on religious freedom, but the larger Virginia Convention made further changes. It was later amended by Committee and the entire Convention, including the addition of a section on the right to a uniform government (Section 14). Patrick Henry persuaded the convention to delete a section that would have prohibited bills of attainder, arguing that ordinary laws could be ineffective against some terrifying offenders.

Edmund Pendleton proposed the line "when they enter into a state of society" which allowed slave holders to support the declaration of universal rights which would be understood not to apply to slaves as they were not part of civil society.

Mason based his initial draft on the rights of citizens described in earlier works such as the English Bill of Rights (1689) and the writings of John Locke. The Declaration can be considered the first modern Constitutional protection of individual rights for citizens of North America. It rejected the notion of privileged political classes or hereditary offices such as the members of Parliament and House of Lords described in the English Bill of Rights.

The Declaration consists of sixteen articles on the subject of which rights "pertain to [the people of Virginia] ... as the basis and foundation of Government."  In addition to affirming the inherent nature of rights to life, liberty, property, and pursuing and obtaining happiness and safety, the Declaration both describes a view of Government as the servant of the people, and enumerates its separation of powers into the administration, legislature, and judiciary.  Thus, the document is unusual in that it not only prescribes legal rights, but it also describes moral principles upon which a government should be run.

Contents
Articles 1–3 address the subject of rights and the relationship between government and the governed.  Article 1 states that "all men are by nature equally free and independent, and have certain inherent rights of which ... they cannot deprive or divest their posterity; namely, the enjoyment of life and liberty, with the means of acquiring and possessing property, and pursuing and obtaining happiness and safety," a statement later made internationally famous in the second paragraph of the U.S. Declaration of Independence, as "we hold these truths to be self-evident, that all men are created equal, and are endowed by their Creator with certain unalienable rights, that among these are Life, Liberty and the pursuit of Happiness."

Articles 2 and 3 state the concept that "all power is vested in, and consequently derived from, the people ..." and that "whenever any government shall be found inadequate or contrary to these purposes, a majority of the community hath an indubitable, unalienable, and indefeasible right to reform, alter or abolish it, in such manner as shall be judged most conducive to the public weal."

Article 4 asserts the equality of all citizens, rejecting the notion of privileged political classes or hereditary offices – another criticism of British institutions such as the House of Lords and the privileges of the peerage:  "no set of men, are entitled to exclusive or separate emoluments or privileges from the community, but in consideration of public services; which, not being descendible, neither ought the offices of magistrate, legislator, or judge be hereditary."

Articles 5 and 6 recommend the principles of separation of powers and free elections, "frequent, certain, and regular" of executives and legislators: "That the legislative and executive powers of the state should be separate and distinct from the judicative; and, that the members of the two first ... should, at fixed periods, be reduced to a private station, return into that body from which they were originally taken ... by frequent, certain, and regular elections."

Articles 7–16 propose restrictions on the powers of the government, declaring the government should not have the power of suspending or executing laws, "without consent of the representatives of the people"; establishing the legal rights to be "confronted with the accusers and witnesses, to call for evidence in his favor, and to a speedy trial by an impartial jury of his vicinage," and to prevent a citizen from being "compelled to give evidence against himself." protections against "cruel and unusual punishments", baseless search and seizure, and the guarantees of a trial by jury, freedom of the press, freedom of religion ("all men are equally entitled to the free exercise of religion"), and "the proper, natural, and safe defence of a free state"  rested in a well regulated militia composed of the body of the people, trained to arms,  that standing armies in time of peace, should be avoided as dangerous to liberty;  Article 8 protects a person against "being deprived of his liberty except by the law of the land" which later evolved into the due process clause in the federal Bill of Rights. Article 12 is the first ever codification of the right to a free press and was an important precursor to the First Amendment to the United States Constitution.

Text
The following is the complete text of the Virginia Declaration of Rights:

The committee draft was written chiefly by George Mason, and the final version was adopted by the Virginia Convention with significant amendments by Robert C. Nicholas and James Madison on June 12, 1776.

Influence
The Virginia Declaration of Rights heavily influenced later documents. The Committee of Five is thought to have drawn on it when they drafted the United States Declaration of Independence in the same month (June 1776). James Madison was also influenced by the Declaration while drafting the Bill of Rights (introduced September 1789, ratified 1791).

The Virginia Declaration of Rights was one of the earliest documents to emphasize the protection of individual rights, rather than protecting only members of Parliament or consisting of simple laws that can be changed as easily as passed. For instance, it was the first declaration of rights to call for a free press.

Virginia's western counties cited the Declaration of Rights as a justification for rejecting the state's Ordinance of Secession before the American Civil War.  The delegates to the Wheeling Convention argued that under the Declaration of Rights, any change in the form of government had to be approved by a referendum.  Since the Secession Convention had not been convened by a referendum, the western counties argued that all of its acts were void.  This set in motion the chain of events that ultimately led the western counties to break off as the separate state of West Virginia.

Quotations derived from the Declaration

 "We hold these truths to be self-evident, that all men are created equal, that they are endowed by their Creator with certain unalienable Rights, that among these are Life, Liberty and the pursuit of Happiness. —That to secure these rights, Governments are instituted among Men, deriving their just powers from the consent of the governed" — United States Declaration of Independence (July 1776)
 "Men are born and remain free and equal in rights. Social distinctions can be founded only on the common utility." — French Declaration of the Rights of Man and of the Citizen (1789)
 "A well regulated Militia, being necessary to the security of a free State, the right of the people to keep and bear Arms, shall not be infringed." (although the Virginia Declaration makes no reference to a "right to keep or bear arms") — Second Amendment to the United States Constitution (December 1791)

Notes

External links

 The Virginia Declaration of Rights (George Mason's Draft, 20–26 May 1776)
 The Virginia Declaration of Rights (Committee Draft, 27 May 1776)
 The Virginia Declaration of Rights (Final Draft, 12 June 1776)
 The Virginia Declaration of Rights (from the National Archives)
 Shaping the Constitution: The Virginia Declaration of Rights, from the Library of Virginia and the Library of Congress

1776 in the United States
1776 in Virginia
American Enlightenment
George Mason
History of human rights
History of the Thirteen Colonies
United States Declaration of Independence
United States documents
Virginia in the American Revolution